Henry Mitcalfe (1788 – 1853) was a British Conservative politician.

Mitcalfe was elected Conservative Member of Parliament for Tynemouth and North Shields at the 1841 general election and held the seat until 1847 when he did not seek re-election.

References

External links
 

UK MPs 1841–1847
Conservative Party (UK) MPs for English constituencies
1788 births
1853 deaths